Munnel is a 2023 Sri Lankan Tamil language drama film written, directed and produced by Visakesa Chandrasekaram. The film was screened at the International Film Festival Rotterdam and opened to positive reviews from critics.

Cast 

 Sivakumar Lingeswaran as Rudran
 Thurkka Magendran as Vaani

Synopsis 
The film's plot revolves around a Tamil militant called Rudran (Sivakumar Lingeswaran) who returns home from military detention after being released on bail. He was arrested for committing felonies/attrocites against the Democratic Socialist Republic of Sri Lanka and was accused for charges under the section 17 of the Prevention of terrorism Act 1978 and under section 17 of gathering intelligence on the military  to carry out ambushes and for not providing information to the government authorities regarding the LTTE actions. He later goes out in search for his missing girlfriend Vaani (Thurkka Magendran) who had disappeared during the Sri Lankan Civil War. He then joins a month-long pilgrimage hoping to meet Vaani.

Production 
The cast and crew members were predominantly chosen from Tamil speaking North and East parts of Sri Lanka. The film was predominantly shot and set amid rolling powercuts, blackouts, soaring cost of living and fuel shortage fueled by the 2019-present Sri Lankan economic crisis.

Accolades 
The film won the special jury award at the 52nd International Film Festival (IFFR) in Amsterdam, The Netherlands.

References

External links 

 

2023 films
Sri Lankan Tamil-language films
2023 drama films